Hamburger Hill is a 1987 American war film set during the Battle of Hamburger Hill, a May 1969 assault during the Vietnam War by the U.S. Army's 3rd Battalion, 187th Infantry, 101st Airborne Division (Airmobile) "Screaming Eagles" on a ridge of Dong Ap Bia (Ap Bia Mountain) near the Laotian border in central Vietnam. The ridge was a well-fortified position, including trenchworks and bunkers, of the North Vietnamese Army.

Written by James Carabatsos and directed by John Irvin, the film starred Dylan McDermott (his film debut), Steven Weber, Courtney B. Vance, Don Cheadle and Michael Boatman. It was produced by RKO Pictures and distributed by Paramount Pictures, and was shot in the Philippines. The novelization was written by William Pelfrey.

Plot

In 1969, a platoon of soldiers fight in Vietnam, ending with a soldier dying on a helicopter. As they prepare to be sent into action again, a platoon of the 3d Battalion, 187th Infantry, 101st Airborne Division (Airmobile), receives five new recruits as replacements—Beletsky, who constantly complains that he won't be able to remember everything he has been taught; Languilli, who is obsessed with sex and annoyed when people mispronounce his name; Washburn, a quiet, conservative man and the only African-American in the batch of replacements; Bienstock, who is outgoing and has volunteered for combat duty in Vietnam; and finally Galvan, the quietest but most promising of the new soldiers.

Taken under the wing of their war-weary squad leader, Staff Sgt. Adam Frantz, the recruits spend their early days filling sand bags and struggling to sleep before being placed in Frantz's squad. They are then given a crash-course in battlefield skills, including everything from oral hygiene to a demonstration by a Viet Cong deserter on how skilfully enemy troops can penetrate the perimeter of U.S. defenses. Frantz does his best to prepare the new soldiers for combat, but expresses frustration before the VC deserter silently penetrates a barbed wire barrier and aims a rocket launcher at them.

Aside from the replacements, the platoon has a new commander, Lieutenant Eden, and Sergeant First Class Worcester. The platoon's machine gun team is composed of the burly Private Duffy and his mismatched, bespectacled companion, Private Gaigin. There are also three African-American veterans in the unit: Motown, "Doc" Johnson and Sgt. McDaniel (who has less than a month left on his tour), all of whom have first-hand knowledge of the racial discrimination still practiced in the army.

The new arrivals get their first, sudden taste of war when a quiet spell beside a river is interrupted by an enemy mortar bombardment. Frantz calls for counter battery fire ending the mortar fire. Several civilians are killed in the exchange and one of the replacements, Galvan, is decapitated by a bomb splinter. The death of a soldier further riles up Staff Sgt. Frantz. Soon, the platoon takes part in a major operation and is air-lifted into the A Shau Valley. Shortly after disembarking at the landing zone, they come under automatic weapons fire and a firefight ensues. The North Vietnamese soldiers withdraw after suffering at least one apparent casualty. McDaniel is also killed. This loss provokes considerable bitterness and tension from "Doc" Johnson, who blames Frantz for not getting the short-timer McDaniel a less dangerous assignment.

The battalion is ordered to reconnoiter a nearby mountain but is unexpectedly diverted and commences an assault on Hill 937 which soon grows into the Battle of Hamburger Hill as unexpectedly determined resistance is encountered. The North Vietnamese, rather than using hit-and-run tactics, as they had in previous engagements, defend well-entrenched positions. The platoon is forced to attack the hill repeatedly against stubborn opposition. Between assaults, US air-strikes steadily strip away all vegetation with napalm and white phosphorus, leaving the hill a barren, scorched wasteland. In one assault, a battle-crazed and wounded Duffy, wielding an M60, seems on the verge of carrying the day as enemy resistance begins to crumble. Botched air support by helicopter gunships causes several friendly casualties, to the horror of Lt. Eden and his radio telephone operator, Murphy. The assault fails and Duffy is among the fatalities.

In between attacks, the shrinking platoon tries to rest, chattering about social upheaval and unrest back home. Bienstock is devastated by a letter from his girlfriend, whose college friends have told her that it is immoral to remain with a soldier. Beletsky gets a letter on tape from his girl back home and Frantz is surprised (and moved) that she mentions his name. Sergeant Worcester describes to his comrades the alienation and hostility he encountered on his return from his previous tour of duty, along with the collapse of his marriage and how a good friend, whose son had been killed in Vietnam during the Battle of Ia Drang in 1965, had been driven to an emotional breakdown by cruel phone calls from anti-war college students, gloating over his son's death. Frantz relates a story on how he volunteered for the airborne. "The only reason I went airborne was Collins", he said. When orders came down for a dangerous operation, "Collins" refused to participate. Later, Frantz also has a confrontation with a TV reporter, telling him that he has more respect for the NVA on the hill than for the reporter.

The exhausted platoon continues the attempt to capture Hill 937, to no avail. The tenth assault takes place in torrential rain. Gaigin is killed, Beletsky and "Doc" Johnson are wounded. Before he is evacuated, Doc tells Frantz and Motown to capture the hill so that they will at least have something to be proud of but appears to succumb to his wounds moments later as a medevac helicopter lands. Beletsky, despite having received a "million dollar wound," decides to return to his unit.

The eleventh and final assault is mounted by the remaining troops, whose bitterness and exhaustion is overcome by desperation and unit pride. The final enemy positions are overrun but the cost is heavy. Lieutenant Eden is seriously wounded, losing his arm. Murphy, Worcester, Motown, Bienstock and Languilli are killed before the few remaining troops make it to the summit. Frantz, stunned by the loss of so many friends, is dazed and wounded by an enemy bayonet. Beletsky, also wounded but enraged, leads the final push to the summit. A bleeding and weak Frantz also makes it to the top and rests by a stump alongside Beletsky and Washburn as the battlefield finally goes silent. The final image is the now battle-aged, tear-streaked and haunted face of Beletsky as he gazes at the carnage below. Constant radio chatter is overheard but there is no reply.

Epilogue
The movie epilogue is a poem by Major Michael Davis O'Donnell, January 1, 1970, Dak To, Vietnam which reads as follows: "If you are able, save for them a place inside of you and save one backward glance when you are leaving for the places they can no longer go.  Be not ashamed to say you loved them, though you may not have always.  Take what they have left and what they have taught you with their dying and keep it with your own.  And in that time when men decide and feel safe to call the war insane, take one moment to embrace those gentle heroes you left behind."

Novelization
The novelized version of the film, written by William Pelfrey, based on the screenplay by James Carabatsos, featured several additional scenes not featured in the final cut of the film. These included prologue and epilogue scenes set years after the war where Frantz, now a civilian and happily married with children, visits the Vietnam Memorial Wall in Washington, D.C. and asks his young son to plant a small flag below Languilli's name. Another additional scene occurs one night between the assaults on Hill 937, where the North Vietnamese Army launch a surprise counterattack.

Cast
NOTE: Listed in order of authority and rank. The green color coded boxes in the rows indicate that character survived the battle. The pink colored boxes indicate the character either died or was wounded.

Production
Producer Marcia Nasatir has a son who fought as a soldier in Vietnam, which is one of the reasons why she came up with the idea for the film. Writer and co-producer James Carabatsos had served with the 1st Cavalry Division (Airmobile) in 1968-69 and spent five years interviewing soldiers involved in the combat there and researching the Battle of Hamburger Hill.  Irvin, an English-born filmmaker, worked on several documentaries in Vietnam in 1969.

The film was produced independently, with the money being raised through foreign sales. According to Irvin, Paramount passed on Hamburger Hill when they initially pitched it, but they picked it up when the film was finally shot in the Philippines.

Release 
In a 2021 interview John Irvin said that Hamburger Hill could have been released before Platoon and Full Metal Jacket "if Paramount had been a bit braver." Because Vietnam was not considered a popular subject, Paramount wanted to see how Platoon performed at the box office. According to Irvin, Hamburger Hill was again pushed back when Stanley Kubrick pushed for Full Metal Jacket to be released before Hamburger Hill.

Reception
Vincent Canby of The New York Times called Hamburger Hill a "well-made Vietnam War film that narrows its attention to the men of a single platoon in a specific operation." Differentiating the film from Platoon, released the year before, he noted the film "refuses to put its characters and events into any larger frame. It could have been made a week after the conclusion of the operation it recalls, which is both its strength and weakness, depending on how you look at it." Hal Hinson of The Washington Post'' credited the filmmakers for creating a "deeply affecting, highly accomplished film", but felt that "[Carabatsos] and his collaborators seem to feel compelled not only to show us their war, but tell us what we're to think about it", weakening the film's effect and keeping it from being a "great war movie". On review aggregator Rotten Tomatoes, the film has an approval rating of 100% with an average score of 7.35/10.

Box office
The film debuted at No. 5 at the US box office bringing in a total of $13.3 million.

References

External links
 
 

1987 films
1987 independent films
1980s war drama films
American films based on actual events
American independent films
American war drama films
Films scored by Philip Glass
Films directed by John Irvin
Films set in 1969
Films shot in the Philippines
Vietnam War films
War films based on actual events
RKO Pictures films
Films about the United States Army
1987 drama films
1980s English-language films
1980s American films